Carlos Scarone (10 November 1888 – 12 May 1965) was a Uruguayan footballer who played as forward. Despite he played in several clubs of Argentina and Uruguay, Scarone is mostly known for his tenure on Nacional, where he stayed nine years, scoring 152 goals in 227 matches played. 

At club level, Scarone won a total of 23 titles (all of them with Nacional), 17 domestic league and cups and 6 international cups.

At international level, Scarone played in 25 matches for the Uruguay national football team from 1909 to 1922. He was also part of Uruguay's squad in three Copa América (then, "South American Championship") in 1917, 1919, and 1920, also winning two titles.

After retiring from football, Scarone became manager of Nacional in 1932. He was brother of another notable player of Nacional, Héctor Scarone.

Titles
CURCC
 Primera División (1): 1911

Nacional
 Primera División (8): 1915, 1916, 1917, 1919, 1920, 1922, 1923, 1924 
 Copa Competencia (5): 1914, 1915, 1919, 1921, 1923
 Copa Honor (4): 1914, 1915, 1916, 1917
 Tie Cup (1): 1915
 Copa de Honor Cousenier (3): 1915, 1916, 1917
 Copa Aldao (2): 1919, 1920

Uruguay national team
 Copa América (2): 1919, 1920

References

External links
 

1888 births
1965 deaths
Uruguayan footballers
Uruguay international footballers
Place of birth missing
Association football forwards